The Power of a Dream Golf Classic was a golf tournament for professional women golfers on the Futures Tour, the LPGA Tour's developmental tour. The event was part of the Futures Tour's schedule in 2006 and 2007. It took place at The Trails of Frisco Golf Club in Frisco, Texas.

The tournament was a 54-hole event, as are most Futures Tour tournaments, and included pre-tournament pro-am opportunities, in which local amateur golfers can play with the professional golfers from the Tour as a benefit for local charities. The benefiting charities from The Power of a Dream Golf Classic were HomeAid/Homebuilders Care and Camp Fire USA Lone Star Council.

Winners

Tournament records

External links
Futures Tour official website
The Trails of Frisco Golf Club official website

Former Symetra Tour events
Golf in Texas